The Loved Ones is a 2009 Australian horror film written and directed by Sean Byrne and starring Xavier Samuel, Robin McLeavy, Victoria Thaine, Jessica McNamee, Richard Wilson, and John Brumpton. It follows a teenager (Samuel) who finds himself at the center of a female classmate's (McLeavy) demented party after he declines her offer to attend a school dance.

Plot
High schooler Brent is driving with his father Dan when a bloodied man appears in the middle of the road. Swerving to avoid the man, Brent crashes his vehicle into a tree, killing his father. Six months later, Brent politely turns down Lola Stone's invitation to the prom in favor of his girlfriend Holly. Lola secretly watches the two having sex in Holly's car. Guilt-ridden over his father's death, Brent has turned to recreational cannabis use and self-harm with a razor blade hidden in his necklace. At home, Brent's mother Carla insists on him taking a taxi rather than ride with an inexperienced Holly. Brent leaves his house and goes to a nearby cliff. He briefly contemplates suicide, but changes his mind. As he listens to music, someone knocks Brent out.

Brent wakes up bound to a chair. His captors are Lola and her father Eric, who have decorated their house in imitation of a prom. The three are sat at a table along with a lobotomized woman they call Bright Eyes. Lola injects Brent's voice box with bleach, destroying his vocal cords making him unable to scream or talk. She begins to humiliate him, experiencing arousal in the process. Brent frees himself and runs outside, but is re-captured by the sadistic father and daughter, who pin his feet to the floor with knives. Lola shows Brent a scrapbook with photos of her past victims. Brent recognizes Timmy Valentine, the bloodied man who caused his crash. Timmy turns out to be the brother of Mia Valentine, the prom date of Jamie, Brent's best friend. Lola then brands Brent by carving her initials onto his chest and sprinkling salt on it. After Eric crowns Lola prom queen, she admits having incestuous feelings for him. The two dance and almost kiss before Brent interrupts them.

Eric opens a trapdoor on the floor, revealing a basement cellar with the previous abductees still alive. Lola drills a hole through Brent's skull and prepares to lobotomize him by pouring boiling water into the hole. Brent manages to free himself again. He attacks Eric with his hidden razor blade and stabs him with one of the knives he pulled out of his feet. He pushes Eric into the cellar, where the starving and now deranged (and presumably lobotomised) captives tear him apart. An unhinged Lola pushes Brent into the cellar and throws everything she can get her hands on at him. Brent finds a flashlight and a hammer among the thrown objects and uses them to defend himself against the captives. Lola then smothers Bright Eyes - who turns out to be her mother - with a pillow, out of jealousy.

When Brent does not show up to the date, a worried Holly informs Mia's father, a police officer. He enters Lola's house, where Lola kills him with a meat cleaver. Lola taunts Brent, saying she will kill Carla as revenge for her father, and kill Holly for breaking her heart. After she leaves, Brent climbs out of the pit using the pile of corpses. As Lola walks on the road, she sees Holly approaching in her car. She throws her scrapbook at the windshield, and attacks Holly, who flees on foot. Brent arrives in the police car and runs over Lola. Holly clambers into the police car and is shocked to see Brent; the two embrace tearfully. A severely injured Lola approaches the car. Brent reverses the car, striking Lola in the head and crushing her skull. Brent and Holly arrive back home, where a shocked Carla embraces her son.

Cast

 Xavier Samuel as Brent
 Robin McLeavy as Lola
 John Brumpton as Eric
 Richard Wilson as Jamie
 Victoria Thaine as Holly
 Jessica McNamee as Mia
 Andrew S. Gilbert as Paul
 Suzi Dougherty as Carla
 Victoria Eagger as Judith
 Anne Scott-Pendlebury as Bright Eyes
 Fred Whitlock as Dan

Production
The Loved Ones is the first feature film for short filmmaker Sean Byrne. The Ambience Entertainment production was completely shot in Melbourne, Victoria, including interior school scenes shot at Box Hill Senior Secondary College and Kew High School. The film stars Xavier Samuel, Jessica McNamee, Robin McLeavy, and Richard Wilson.

It was originally given an R18+ rating by the Australian Classification Board, but through an appeal by the Review Board, the film's rating was successfully replaced by an MA15+ rating due to the comedy aspect of the film mitigating both the sadistic aspect and the impact of the violence.

The original soundtrack was composed by Australian experimental musician Ollie Olsen. Other bands and musicians whose songs are featured in the film include Cosmic Psychos, Sophie Koh, Kasey Chambers, Parkway Drive, British India, Witch Hats, Little Red, and Little River Band.

Release
The film screened at several festivals, including the Toronto International Film Festival on 13 September 2009 and the Hong Kong International Film Festival on 3 April 2010. In America, it was screened at the AFI Fest on 31 October 2009, the San Francisco International Film Festival on 2 May 2010, the 2010 Dallas International Film Festival, and the 2010 SXSW Film Festival.

Home media
The first DVD copies were released in the United States in November 2009 over the American Film Market. The Loved Ones ran in a limited theatrical release in the US. On 1 June 2012, the film was shown in Austin, Chicago, Houston, Los Angeles, New York, and San Francisco. Paramount Pictures and Insurge Pictures took over the US rights.

A Blu-ray version of the film has yet to be released in the United States. The film debuted on Blu-ray in the United Kingdom on October 8, 2010, in a Region B–locked disc. The film debuted on Blu-ray in Japan on August 5, 2015, in a Region free disc, though it lacks any extras aside from two trailers and is now out of print.

Reception

On review aggregation website Rotten Tomatoes, The Loved Ones earned a rating of 98% and an average score of 7.24/10 based on 56 reviews. The site's consensus for the film reads, "Successfully mixing the conventions of the teen and horror genres with a twist, Australian director Sean Byrne makes a striking directorial debut with The Loved Ones." This film ranks  49th place on the site's Top 100 Horror Movies list.  The film has been lauded for its tongue-in-cheek approach and its main twist towards the end of the film. It won the Cadillac People's Choice Award - Midnight Madness in 2009.

Accolades

Real-life crime
In March 2013 at Chester Crown Court, Judge Elgan Edwards described a sadistic torture murder as a re-enactment of a scene from this film. During sentencing, Judge Evans described the defendant, Gary George, as particularly liking The Loved Ones. The victim, Andrew Nall, was brutally beaten, sustained 49 knife wounds, and had cleaning fluid found in his eyes. George was sentenced to life imprisonment with a minimum term of 30 years.

References

External links
 
 

2009 films
2009 horror films
2009 thriller films
2000s high school films
2000s horror thriller films
2000s teen horror films
Australian horror thriller films
Australian teen films
Films about proms
Films set in Victoria (Australia)
Films about self-harm
Incest in film
Teen thriller films
2000s English-language films
Screen Australia films